Mila is a 2001 Filipino drama film directed by Joel C. Lamangan with its screenplay written by Ricky Lee that was based upon the life story of Anita Pamintuan. It stars Maricel Soriano, Piolo Pascual, Princess Punzalan, Cherry Pie Picache, Kaye Abad, Serena Dalrymple, Jiro Manio and Angelica Panganiban. It was produced and released by Star Cinema as part of their 8th anniversary presentation.

Premise
The film was based on the life story of Anita Pamintuan who died during her fight for proper wages and compensation for public school teachers in the Philippines. Anita helped the street children to learn how to count, read and write; she helped the people of Ermita, Manila.

Cast and characters
 Maricel Soriano as Mila Cabangon
 Piolo Pascual as Primo
 Princess Punzalan as Linda
 Cherry Pie Picache as Rona
 Kaye Abad as Winona
 Serena Dalrymple as Jenny
 Jiro Manio as Peklat
 Angelica Panganiban as Leni
 Luis Alandy as Ruel
 Nonie Buencamino as Nato
 Eva Darren as Mila's mother
 B.J. De Jesus as Boyet
 Kathleen Hermosa as Teresa
 Mel Kimura as Lucille
 Alfred Labatos as Momoy
 Don Laurel as Ronnel
 Tony Mabesa as Mr. De Castro
 Mario Magallona as Rambo
 Bea Nicolas as Belay
 Tom Olivar as Torres
 Jim Pebanco as Noli Malvar
 Caridad Sanchez as Ms. Pangan
 Berting Labra
 Soliman Cruz
 Florencio A. Pili as Mila's co-teacher

Cameo
 Noel Cabangon as himself

Production

MTRCB rating
Despite the film having no "adult-aimed" themes, it was almost given an R-18 rating by the MTRCB due to the two uses of the severe profane word used by the characters of Maricel Soriano and Cherry Pie Picache. Joel Lamangan, the film's director, criticized the censor board and blamed them as the "destroyer of the Philippine film industry" after MTRCB chair Anding Roces gave the said rating to the film. To settle the issue, the censor board finally gave the film a PG-13 rating instead of R-18.

Marketing
As part of the film's release, Star Cinema launched a nationwide essay-writing contest named "Sino ang Mila sa Buhay Ko – The Greatest Teacher In My Life", where participants would create an essay about their Mila on their lives. The film's screenwriter Ricky Lee; singer and youth role model Cris Villonco; Etta Rosales, the representative of AKBAYAN party-list; Benilda Santos, the chairperson of Ateneo de Manila University - Filipino Department; and Tammy Bejerano, the senior creative manager of the film studio served as the panelists for the contest.

Release
The film was first premiered in the Philippines on June 26, 2001, at SM Megamall as well as a general release on June 27. It had a Philippine television premiere on Cinema One and a world premiere on Cinemax.

Recognitions

FAMAS
Nominated Best Child Actor for Jiro Manio at the 2002 FAMAS Awards.

Gawad Urian
Nominated Best Actress for Maricel Soriano at the 2002 Gawad Urian Awards.

References

External links
 

2001 films
Philippine drama films
Star Cinema films
Star Cinema drama films
Films directed by Joel Lamangan